Nueva Extremadura means "New Extremadura" in Spanish, and originates from Extremadura, Spain.

Nueva Extremadura could refer to

 a large jurisdiction in the north of New Spain, bordered in the 17th century to its west and south by Nueva Vizcaya, by Nuevo León to its southeast; by Nuevo Santander to its east, and, to its northeast, by Louisiana.  After 1722, its northeastern border was the New Philippines.  Today many identify the state of Coahuila in Mexico with the former Nueva Extremadura, but the present state's borders are not the same.  For example, Nueva Vizcaya occupied the southwest of present-day Coahuila; Nuevo León, the neighbor to the east, also had claims to eastern New Extremaduran lands; the border with the New Philippines was at the Medina river (near present-day San Antonio, in the U.S. state of Texas).  From 1687, the territory's official name was Provincia de San Francisco de Coahuila y Nueva Extremadura.

 the name originally given to Chile by Pedro de Valdivia. Its capital was then known as Santiago de Nueva Extremadura.

See also
History of Chile
Santiago de Chile
History of Mexico
Coahuila y Tejas
Territorial evolution of Mexico

References

New Spain
Viceroyalty of Peru
Colonial Mexico
Colonial United States (Spanish)
Mexican Texas
Former provinces of Spain
Former states of Mexico